Klaudia Rrotani (born 16 May 1995) is an Albanian footballer who plays as a forward for the Albania women's national team.

See also
List of Albania women's international footballers

References

1995 births
Living people
Women's association football forwards
Albanian women's footballers
Footballers from Shkodër
Albanian footballers
Albania women's international footballers
KFF Vllaznia Shkodër players